Philip Porwei Otele (born 15 April 1999) is a Nigerian footballer who plays for Liga I club UTA Arad as a forward.

References

External links
 

1999 births
Living people
Sportspeople from Port Harcourt
Nigerian emigrants to the United Kingdom
Nigerian footballers
Association football forwards
FK Kauno Žalgiris players
FC UTA Arad players
A Lyga players
Liga I players